Zoetermeer Panthers is a former semi-professional ice hockey team in the Eredivisie, the Dutch professional, top-level hockey league.  They played in the Silverdome, an ice sports facility in Zoetermeer, Netherlands.  They began play for the 2010-2011 season in the Dutch Bekercompetitie, the league leading up to the National Cup championship game. On November 26 the club announced that they would withdraw from  the Eredivisie, effective immediately, due to lack of sponsors and poor attendance figures.  They currently maintain two teams in the amateur Eerste Divisie league.

Season results
Note: GP = Games played, W = Wins, OTW = Overtime Wins, OTL = Overtime Losses, L = Losses, GF = Goals for, GA = Goals against, Pts = Points

Squad 2018-2019

Goalies

 #1 Simon Schneider
 #35 Fabian Schotel
 #37 Casper Swart

Defence
 #41 Adam Blanchette
 #9 Johnny Ebregt
 #7 Adam Gebara
 #10 Wesley Hendriks
 #2 Travis Martell
 #26 Michael van Rijswijk
 #20 Dax van de Velden
 #24 Jeff Winchester
 #14 Nick van Zon

Forwards
 #23 Scott van den Elskamp
 #11 Terry Harrison
 #21 Marcel Kars
 #22 Marc LeFebvre
 #3 Joey Oosterveld
 #94 Andrew Schembri
 #71 Mike Smietana
 #61 Danny Stempher
 #19 Joy Turpijn
 #27 Pascal van de Velde

Championships
 Eredivisie National Championship

None.

'''Beker  (National Cup)

None.

References

External links
 Official website (in Dutch)
 Panthers videos
 Dutch Ice hockey Federation (in Dutch)
 Panthers description on IJshockey.com (in Dutch)
 

BeNe League (ice hockey) teams
Ice hockey teams in the Netherlands
Ice hockey clubs established in 2010
Sports clubs in South Holland
Sport in Zoetermeer